"All We Know" is a song by American rock band Paramore. It was originally released on December 16, 2006, from their debut studio album, All We Know Is Falling (2005). It was written by lead vocalist Hayley Williams, and is about the departure of the band's bassist, Jeremy Davis.

Background
"All We Know" is about the departure of the band's bass player, Jeremy Davis, and the divorce of Hayley Williams' parents.

Reception
According to MusicOMH, the song is "...full of catchy hooks and lyrics you can scream along to in your bedroom". They go on to remark "they deliver their music with such aplomb that its hard to believe how young they are." Ed Masley at The Arizona Republic ranked it as the 9th best Paramore song, stating "it's held up really well, with its chugging punk guitars and Williams' soaring delivery of lyrics".

Music video
A music video directed by Dan Dobi was filmed during their American tour and features clips of the band performing the song live at several locations.

As of May 2021, the song has 10 million views on YouTube.

References

Paramore songs
2006 singles
2007 singles
Songs written by Hayley Williams
Songs written by Josh Farro
2005 songs
Fueled by Ramen singles